Dunree is a townland in north-west Inishowen, in County Donegal, Ireland.

The area, which lies on the shore of Lough Swilly, has a number of tourist attractions such as Dunree Beach, Dunree Lighthouse (which was built in the 1870s), and Fort Dunree. Fort Dunree is a military museum located on Dunree Head about seven miles north of Buncrana. The museum houses a display of military memorabilia and artefacts as well as several large guns from the twentieth century. Next to the fort is Dunree Beach, which tourists and visitors use for parking.

References

External links
 Dunree military museum

Geography of County Donegal